Epiblema acceptana is a species of moth of the family Tortricidae. It is found in China (Heilongjiang) and the Russian Far East (Amur).

References

Moths described in 1883
Eucosmini